Nadiya Volynska is a Ukrainian orienteering competitor. At the World Games in 2013 she won a bronze medal in the middle distance, behind Minna Kauppi and Tove Alexandersson, and ahead of Anne Margrethe Hausken Nordberg. Since then, Volynska has specialised in Sprint Orienteering. She now has 3 silver medals at major championships.

References

External links

Year of birth missing (living people)
Living people
Ukrainian orienteers
Female orienteers
Foot orienteers
World Orienteering Championships medalists
World Games bronze medalists
Competitors at the 2013 World Games
Competitors at the 2017 World Games
World Games medalists in orienteering